Tuftelin-interacting protein 11 is a protein that in humans is encoded by the TFIP11 gene.

Interactions
TFIP11 has been shown to interact with Tuftelin.{

References

Further reading